The Indian Caribbean Museum of Trinidad and Tobago is a museum in Carapichaima, Trinidad and Tobago. It is dedicated to preserving the history of Indo-Caribbean culture. It is housed in the Waterloo Carnegie Library, near the Temple in the Sea. The museum, founded in 2006, then was the first of its kind in the Caribbean.

See also
 Indo-Trinidadian and Tobagonian

External links
 Official website

2006 establishments in Trinidad and Tobago
Carnegie libraries
Indo-Trinidadian and Tobagonian culture
Library buildings completed in 1919
Museums established in 2006
Museums in Trinidad and Tobago